Casa Pia Atlético Clube is a Portuguese multi-sports founded in 1920 and based in Lisbon, Portugal, best-known for its football team, that competes in the Primeira Liga. The club is named after Casa Pia, a Portuguese children's charity, and many of its athletes come from that institution. Its football stadium is Estádio Pina Manique, named in honor of Pina Manique, the founder of Casa Pia children's charity. Casa Pia AC was one of the most versatile Portuguese clubs, having played 25 sports, with the curiosity of having been the only one who practiced Baseball regularly, beating the strong team of the American Colony on 4 July 1923 at Campo das Laranjeiras by 25-24.

On 18 December 1921, when Portugal made their international debut against Spain in Madrid, Casa Pia FC provided the squad with four players in a 1–3 loss, including Cândido de Oliveira, who was the team captain. Casa Pia promoted from Serie E of Terceira Divisão to Centre Group of Portuguese Second Division in 2009–10 season as champions. They were promoted again to LigaPro in 2019. The team will play for the first time in 83 years in the Primeira Liga in the 2022–23 season.

History

Early success
Although Casa Pia A.C. was officially founded on 3 July 1920, at the initiative of Cândido de Oliveira, Ricardo Ornelas and David Ferreira (among others), the club's history dates back to 1893, when the Real Casa Pia de Lisboa football team was formed, the first team to defeat the so-called "invincible" team Carcavelos Club in 1898 in a historic victory that forever cemented the practice of football in Portugal.

On 3 October 1920, just a few months after its foundation, Casa Pia FC won its first-ever piece of silverware after beating Benfica 2-1, thus winning the Bronze Herculano Santos. The team was captained by Cândido de Oliveira, and the game was refereed by Cosme Damião.

In its debut season, Casa Pia FC won the Lisbon Regional Championship and the Lisbon Cup without registering a single defeat. And to these titles, Casa Pia added the triumph in the confrontation with the champion of the North, FC Porto, in the then-called Taça 27 de Julho. This game was the final rehearsal for the start of the Portuguese Championship, the forerunner of the Taça de Portugal, which began in the following year.

At 17 months of age, Casa Pia had already participated in three tournaments abroad: Paris, San Sebastián, and Seville. The Casapianos was the first Portuguese team to play in Paris, playing at the Pershing Stadium in the city's Tournament at Christmas 1920, together with the Cercle Athlétic de Paris, Cercle Athlétic de Vitry, FC Cantonal (from Switzerland) and FC Espanya de Barcelona, who headed the
rankings in the championships of their countries. In the opening game, Cercle de Paris beat Casa Pia 2–1, with the Casapian goal scored by Cândido de Oliveira. The trip to Seville took place on 16 October 1921, on the occasion of the inauguration of the Campo de Sports on Avenida de la Reina Victoria, facing Sevilla FC, who was wearing its current emblem on their chests for the first time, and despite the injury suffered by Spencer, who was forced to leave the pitch for much of the match, Sevilla FC achieved a clear victory over the Casapianos, prevailing by three goals to nil, goals scored by León, Kinké and Escobar.

The team's best player was Cândido de Oliveira, one of the founders of the club and the captain, who had grown up in Casa Pia since he was delivered there at the age of nine as an orphan, and who had previously played for Real Casa Pia de Lisboa, founded at the end of the 19th century. Oliveira was the main architect of the team's rise to football power in Lisbon, competing head-to-head against the likes of Benfica and Sporting CP, and largely thanks to his quality, the immediate impact of Casa Pia continued to be felt in the following seasons. In the first four years they competed, the 'Gansos' won the Lisbon Championship three times.

The reputation grew and, on 13 December 1925, the club was invited to face Benfica on the occasion of the inauguration of Estádio das Amoreiras, which was considered at the time the best stadium in the Iberian Peninsula. The Casapians faced Benfica in the 4 categories in front of 15 thousand people, and although it is defeated in the Quartas by 8–1, in Terceiras by 11–0, in Segundas by 4–2, they won in Primeiras by 3–1. Casa Pia FC was also the first team on the continent to travel to the Azores doing it so for free after being invited by Fayal S.C. to play 3 games there in favor of the victims of the 1922 earthquake in that archipelago.

Stagnation
In 1938–39, Casa Pia FC played in the inaugural editions of the National Championship and Taça de Portugal, which still today are the most important football competitions in Portugal. However, its participation in the National Championship in the 1938–39 season was the only one in which the club played in the First Division. Their field, Campo do Restelo, was expropriated in 1939–40 by the Estado Novo for the exhibition of the Portuguese World. Without its own field until 29 August 1954, when the Pina Manique Stadium in Benfica was inaugurated, far from Belém and Casa Pia, the club wandered from one field to another, achieving a brilliant record in National Championships.

Recent history
In the 2020–21 season, Casa Pia registered its 71st participation in National Championships, starting in the 1938–39 season.

Honours
 Campeonato de Lisboa
 Champions (1): 1920–21

 Lisbon Cup
 Champions (1): 1920–21

Divisions

Football
Futsal
Handball
Karate
Gymnastics
Weightlifting
Hockey
Table tennis
Wrestling
Sport fishing

Current squad

Out on loan

Records and statistics 
The club has a single presence at the top level of Portuguese football.

2019-2020 season cut short due to COVID-19 global pandemic

Club Officials

References

External links
Official website

 
Football clubs in Portugal
Sport in Lisbon
Association football clubs established in 1920
1920 establishments in Portugal
Primeira Liga clubs
Portuguese field hockey clubs